Jefferson Apartment Building may refer to:

Jefferson Apartment Building (Niagara Falls, New York), listed on the National Register of Historic Places in Niagara County, New York
Jefferson Apartment Building (Washington, D.C.), listed on the National Register of Historic Places in Washington, D.C.